The Bray Military Cemetery (French: Cimetière britannique de Bray-sur-Somme) is a military cemetery located in the Somme region of France commemorating British and Commonwealth soldiers who fought in the Battle of the Somme in World War I. The cemetery contains mainly those who died from April to March 1916 and in August 1918 near the village of Bray-sur-Somme and over the course of the war in the surrounding area.

Location 
The cemetery is located in the north of Bray-sur-Somme, which is approximately 9 kilometers southeast of Albert, France on the D239 road.

Establishment of the Cemetery 

The cemetery was begun in April 1916 and was used by the British XIV Corps Main Dressing Station in September 1916. In 1917, the cemetery was used by the 5th, 38th and 48th Casualty Clearing Stations. The cemetery was briefly used by the 40th Australian Battalion in August 1918 in their drive through Bray-sur-Somme. After the end of the war, in 1918 and 1924, more graves were brought in from areas north and south of the village. 

The cemetery is rectangular and enclosed by a brick wall covered by white capstones. It was designed by Sir Reginald Blomfield and Arthur James Scott Hutton.

Statistics 
The cemetery contains 874 burials, of which 750 are identified and 124 are unidentified.

References 

Cemeteries in Somme (department)
Commonwealth War Graves Commission cemeteries in France
World War I cemeteries in France